The Estonian Bacon is a meat pig breed from Estonia. It was developed from local landrace by crossbreeding it with German, Danish and Swedish landraces. Its appearance looks similar to the Danish Landrace.

See also
 List of domestic pig breeds

References

 

Pig breeds originating in Estonia
Animal breeds originating in the Soviet Union